The Pureni-class (プレニ) locomotives were a group of steam tank locomotives with 2-6-2 wheel arrangement of used by the Chosen Government Railway (Sentetsu) in Korea. The "Pure" name came from the American naming system for steam locomotives, under which locomotives with 2-6-2 wheel arrangement were called "Prairie".

In all, Sentetsu owned 227 locomotives of all Pure classes, whilst privately owned railways owned another 52; of these 279 locomotives, 169 went to the Korean National Railroad in South Korea and 110 to the Korean State Railway in North Korea.

Description
The Pureni class was introduced in 1905, with nine built in the United States by the Brooks Locomotive Works. Unlike the Purei class, the Pureni had a superheated steam boiler. These, like the 1906 batch of Purei class locomotives, were delivered in knockdown form and assembled at the Incheon shops. The Gyeongbu Railway was nationalised by Sentetsu in 1906, and in 1918 they were renumbered 271 through 279. One further unit was built in 1935 by Nippon Sharyō, as a replacement for the original 276. The nine locomotives were renumbered プレニ1 through プレニ9 in the 1938 general renumbering.

Postwar
After the Liberation and partition of Korea, they were divided between North and South, but the specifics of which engine went where are unclear.

Korean National Railroad 푸러2 (Pureo2) class
At least three Pureni-class locomotives ended up with the Korean National Railroad in the South after the division of Sentetsu's motive power following the partition of the country; these were designated 푸러2 (Pureo2) class by the KNR.

Korean State Railway 부러두 (Purŏdu) class/1200 series
The locomotives taken over by the Korean State Railway in the North were initially designated 부러두 (Purŏdu) class; they were later renumbered in the 1200 series. The total number, their service lives and subsequent fates are unknown.

Construction

References

Locomotives of Korea
Locomotives of North Korea
Locomotives of South Korea
Railway locomotives introduced in 1905
2-6-2 locomotives
Brooks locomotives
Nippon Sharyo locomotives